Joseph Willott Jr. (1855–1936) was a member of the Wisconsin State Assembly.

Biography
Willott was born on June 29, 1855, in Oldbury, Worcestershire, England. He moved to the United States in 1867, settling in Mishawaka, Indiana. In 1872, he moved to Manitowoc, Wisconsin. In 1881, he married Bertha Endress (1858–1930), with whom he raised a son Reuben and a daughter Ada. He was interred on September 19, 1936, in Manitowoc.

Career
Willott was elected to the Assembly in 1898 and was re-elected in 1900 and 1902. Additionally, he was a Manitowoc alderman and was a member of the Manitowoc County Board of Supervisors. He was a Republican.

References

External links
The Political Graveyard

1855 births
1936 deaths
County supervisors in Wisconsin
English emigrants to the United States
Republican Party members of the Wisconsin State Assembly
People from Manitowoc, Wisconsin
People from Mishawaka, Indiana
People from Oldbury, West Midlands